Patricia Therese Michie  (née O'Hara) is Emeritus Professor of Psychology, and co-director of the Schizophrenia Program of the Priority Research Centre in Translational Neuroscience and Mental Health at the University of Newcastle.

Career 
Michie's significant research in mismatch negativity (MMN) provided the first evidence for MMN as a potential early marker for schizophrenia. Her collaboration in this area with Dr Rebbekah Atkinson and Professor Ulrich Schall (also from the University of Newcastle), found two potential markers, which could allow early intervention, and potentially increase the chance of successful long-term treatments. Their resulting paper, published in Biological Psychiatry in 2012, was one of the most highly cited papers that year, as reported by the Schizophrenic Research Institute.

Since her retirement, in May 2009, she has focussed on animal models of schizophrenia using MMN as an endophenotype. She has also published extensively on auditory and visual selection attention, stop-signal inhibition and task-switching. She now works full-time in research with no administrative or teaching responsibilities. She has on-going research collaborators with numerous colleagues at the University of Newcastle, and with other Australian researchers based in Perth, Sydney, Wollongong, Melbourne and Brisbane as well international researchers in Finland and Japan.

Qualifications 
 PhD, Macquarie University
 Bachelor of Arts (Honours), University of New England – graduated 1963

Current positions 
 Emeritus Professor of Psychology
 Co-director of the Schizophrenia Program of the Priority Research Centre in Translational Neuroscience and Mental Health at the University of Newcastle
 Elected Fellow of the Academy of the Social Sciences in Australia
 Chair of the National Committee of Brain and Mind of the Australian Academy of Science

Prior positions 
Prior to retirement, Michie held the positions of:
 Acting Deputy Vice Chancellor (Research)
 Pro-Vice Chancellor (Research), and
 Professor of Psychology at the University of Newcastle.

Michie also previously held professorial positions at the University of Western Australia and Macquarie University.

Publications 
Michie has a large number of published journal articles and conference papers, dating back to 1970. for a complete list refer to her staff profile at the University of Newcastle.

Media references 
 All in the mind: Fragmented Minds Part 2 – ABC Radio National Podcast. Lynne Malcolm: Saturday 8 April 2006 1:00PM
 Newcastle Herald Article: University in schizophrenia DNA breakthrough By BELINDA-JANE DAVIS 23 July 2014, 10 p.m
 The Maitland Mercury: Insight into schizophrenia By Emma Swain 24 July 2014, midnight

References

External links
Profile at University of Newcastle

Australian neuroscientists
Australian psychologists
Australian women neuroscientists
Macquarie University alumni
Academic staff of Macquarie University
University of New England (Australia) alumni
Academic staff of the University of Newcastle (Australia)
Academic staff of the University of Western Australia
Living people
Year of birth missing (living people)
Schizophrenia researchers
Fellows of the Academy of the Social Sciences in Australia